The Lotrščak Tower is a fortified tower located in Zagreb, Croatia, in an old part of town called Gradec or Gornji grad (Upper Town). The tower, which dates to the 13th century, was built to guard the southern gate of the Gradec town wall. The name is derived from Latin campana latrunculorum, meaning "thieves' bell", referring to a bell hung in the tower in 1646 to signal the closing of the town gates.

Cannon
The Grič cannon is one of the Zagreb landmarks. In the 19th century, a fourth floor and windows were added to the tower and a cannon was placed on the top. Since 1 January 1877, the cannon is fired from the tower on Grič to mark midday. The cannon was to give the sign for exact noon for the bell-ringers of the city's churches.

References

 Tower of Lotrščak
 Do you know the story about the Lotrščak Tower?

Buildings and structures in Zagreb
Gornji Grad–Medveščak
Fortified towers
Individual cannons